The 1937–38 British Ice Hockey season featured the English National League and Scottish National League.

English National League

English National Tournament

Results
Group A

Group B

Semifinals
Wembley Monarchs - Wembley Lions 3:3, 2:3
Harringay Greyhounds - Harringay Racers 1:1, 1:4
Final
Wembley Lions - Harringay Racers 4:2, 5:2

London Cup

Results
First round
Earls Court Rangers - Richmond Hawks 4:2, 1:2
Wembley Lions - Harringay Greyhounds 2:1, 1:0
Harringay Racers - Streatham 5:2, 3:2
Wembley Monarchs - Earls Court Royals 7:4, 6:2
Semifinals
Harringay Racers - Wembley Lions 2:1, 3:0
Wembley Monarchs - Earls Court Rangers 5:2, 4:3
Final
Harringay Racers - Wembley Monarchs 6:1, 3:3

Scottish National League
Glasgow Mohawks won the championship and received the Canada Cup.
Scores

Table

Mitchell Trophy

Results

President's Pucks

Results

References 

British